Endri Muçmata (born 21 June 1996 in Kukës) is an Albanian professional footballer who most recently played for KS Kastrioti in the Albanian First Division.

References

1996 births
Living people
People from Kukës
Association football midfielders
Association football defenders
Albanian footballers
FK Kukësi players
KS Sopoti Librazhd players
KF Laçi players
KS Kastrioti players
Kategoria Superiore players
Kategoria e Parë players